Mija Jovanović (9 October 1907 – 26 June 1982) was a Serbian footballer.

Biography
Born in Belgrade, Kingdom of Serbia, he played with SK Jedinstvo Beograd until 1930 when he moved to BSK Beograd. In 1931 he debuted for BSK first team as a center midfielder rendering Sava Marinković. Two years later he would become a right winger. He won the 1930–31 Yugoslav Football Championship with BSK.

He played three matches for the Yugoslav national team.

He died in Belgrade on 26 June 1982.

References

1907 births
1982 deaths
Footballers from Belgrade
Serbian footballers
Yugoslav footballers
Yugoslavia international footballers
SK Jedinstvo Beograd players
OFK Beograd players
Yugoslav First League players
Association football midfielders
Association football defenders